Nick Knight or Nicholas Night may refer to:

People
 Nick Knight (cricketer) (born 1969), former England international cricketer
 Nick Knight (photographer) (born 1958), British fashion photographer, documentary photographer, and web publisher
 Nick Knight (professor), professor of Asian studies
 Nick Knight (born 1959), stage name of American pornographic actor Mickey G.
 Nicholas Egbert Knight (1866–1946), South Dakota politician

Other
 Nick Knight (film), a television movie released in 1989
 Nick Knight (Forever Knight), a fictional character in the TV series Forever Knight
 Nick & Knight, a 2014 eponymous album by American singing duo Nick Carter and Jordan Knight

See also
 Nick at Nite

Knight, Nick